is a Japanese manga series written and illustrated by Kei Sasuga. It was serialized in Kodansha's Weekly Shōnen Magazine from April 2014 to June 2020, with its chapters collected in twenty-eight tankōbon volumes. The manga was published digitally in English by Kodansha USA. An anime television series adaptation produced by Diomedéa was broadcast from January to March 2019 on the MBS's Animeism block. Sentai Filmworks has licensed the series in North America and other countries.

Synopsis

Premise
Natsuo Fujii is hopelessly in love with his teacher, Hina. Trying to move on, he agrees to a mixer. There he meets an odd girl, Rui Tachibana, who invites him to sneak out. She takes him to her house and asks him to have sex with her. Natsuo, frustrated that his love will not bear fruit anyway, loses his virginity to her. The next day, Natsuo's dad tells him that he wants to remarry and his prospective partner is coming to their house that evening. When the door opens, it turns out that Rui is Hina's younger sister and both are daughters of the woman his father wants to marry, Tsukiko Tachibana.

Setting
Domestic Girlfriend tells the story of the conflicted feelings of Natsuo towards his first love and the girl he lost his virginity to; the controversial and conflicting nature of romantic relationships between step-siblings and also between a teacher and a student while highlighting the themes of youth, family, friendships, learning, growing up, and career.

Characters

Natsuo is a high school student who is 17 years old and an aspiring novelist, full of creative impulses but hiding it from all his friends and classmates. He becomes romantically involved with his school-teacher, Hina Tachibana, as well as future classmate and later-stepsister Rui Tachibana.

Rui is a high school student who eventually develops feelings for Natsuo. She initially met him on an outing with friends, where they snuck out and both lost their virginities with one another, to unexpectedly become his stepsister after her mother remarries.

Hina is a high school English teacher who eventually begins a relationship with Natsuo, one of her students who is also her step-brother. 

Momo is a classmate of Rui and Natsuo. She is infamous for being flirtatious and sexually promiscuous (when asked, she estimates she hooked-up with over 30 boys, including one of Natsuo's friends), aside from her hobby of making weird plush dolls. She befriends Rui, who was warned not to deal with her and later sets her sights on Natsuo. She is from a broken family and attempted suicide once. Despite her appearance, she is revealed to be quite smart as she landed in the Top Ten during school exams.

Miu is the sole member of the school's Literature Club until the arrival of Natsuo, Rui, and Momo. She is portrayed as a shy and soft-spoken girl with a sense of strictness when they are in the library. She has a crush on her Japanese teacher Kiriya at high school, but she is too shy to confess her feelings to him.

He is the father of Natsuo. He began to date Tokiko Tachibana, knowing his wife died 10 years ago. He becomes stepfather of Hina and Rui after marrying her.

She is the mother of Hina and Rui. She began to date Akihito Fujii after her husband left her, ostensibly for another woman. She becomes Natsuo's step mother after marrying him.

He is Natsuo's best friend and adviser. He works part-time at a bar.

He is one of Natsuo's friends at school.

He is one of Natsuo's friends at school.

A famous author who publishes under the pseudonym You Hasukawa. He also serves as the school's literature club advisor.

Shu Hagiwara, a married 32 years old man, who is a researcher at a Biology lab at a university.

Masaki Kobayashi is a current bartender and owner of the cafe Fumiya Kurimoto works at and that Natsuo, Rui and Hina frequently visit. In the past, he was a rising star of the Yakuza and son of the head of a Yakuza branch. Sometime after falling in love with another Yakuza male of a rival branch, he would leave the Yakuza behind him in order to pursue happiness through his homosexual lifestyle. 
Kobayashi also acts as a counselor and adviser to his more favorite customers such as Fujii Natsuo and is always willing to help him and others, especially when it comes to love. He has a soft spot for cute males and makes no attempt to hide his desires for those he likes. Kobayashi also dresses brazenly in keeping for any event he attends, although he wears stockings while attending his cafe. 
 He has a good friendship, both drinking and social, with Tachibana Hina, who confides in him her love for Natsuo and her dedication of her life to making Natsuo happy regardless if he loves her back or not, and offers support to Hina when she needs it.

Alex is a high school student who is a member of the Literature Club. He is of American descent. He has a crush on Rui.

Publication

Written and illustrated by Kei Sasuga, Domestic Girlfriend was serialized in Kodansha's Weekly Shōnen Magazine from April 23, 2014 to June 10, 2020. Its 276 individual chapters were collected and released in twenty-eight tankōbon format volumes by Kodansha from July 17, 2014 to August 17, 2020.

Kodansha USA published the English-language translation of the manga via digital download.

Related media

Web video
A web video was released in May 2016 on YouTube, coinciding with the publication of the manga's ninth volume. Meant to be a "demo type love simulation drama", the video allows the viewer to interactively influence the story by choosing between clicking two annotations that lead to separate videos. The video stars Anna Konno as Hina and Hanami Natsume as Rui.

Anime

An anime television series adaptation was announced on July 12, 2018. The series is directed by Shōta Ihata and written by Tatsuya Takahashi, with animation by studio Diomedéa. Naomi Ide provides the series' character designs. The anime aired from January 12 to March 30, 2019, and was broadcast on the Animeism programming block on MBS, TBS, and BS-TBS. The series simulcast in Australia and New Zealand on AnimeLab. Sentai Filmworks acquired the distribution rights for the series in North America, the UK & Ireland, Australasia, South Africa, and other territories, and simulcast the series on select platforms. HIDIVE announced that they will produce an English dub of the anime series. MVM Entertainment have acquired the distribution rights via Sentai Filmworks for the United Kingdom and Ireland.

Reception
As of April 2020, the manga had over 3 million copies in circulation. The first volume was reviewed in Anime News Network by three reviewers. Nik Freeman felt that the manga's step-sibling love triangle was a contrivance and that the sexual elements were a waste of Sasuga's talents, but complimented the drama and comedy, along with the characterization. Rebecca Silverman called the manga's setup a more mature Marmalade Boy, but said that the manga is less melodramatic due to Natsuo being more grounded and sensitive. Amy McNulty noted the manga's extra layers of reality and melodrama, finding Rui to be the most memorable character while Natsuo is still realistic, concluding that the manga has a more honest setup of its tropes.

See also
GE: Good Ending, another manga series by the same author

Notes

References

External links
 at Weekly Shōnen Magazine 
 

2019 anime television series debuts
Anime series based on manga
Animeism
Diomedéa
Kodansha manga
Romance anime and manga
Sentai Filmworks
Shōnen manga